Hit24 was a German television channel that mainly broadcast music from the field of rock and roll and pop. The 24-hour special-interest programme featured music clips, hosted music programmes and live concerts. Broadcasting started on 3 April 2004.

The target group was the over 30-year-olds. The program was produced by Mainstream Media AG of media entrepreneur Gottfried Zmeck in Ismaning (near Munich), just like its counterpart in the field of Volkstümliche Musik Goldstar TV.

Distribution
Hit24 was broadcast via satellite and cable networks as part of Premiere's programme bouquet in Germany and Austria. This distribution was discontinued on 1 July 2009 in the course of the conversion of the program offering as a result of the brand change of Premiere to Sky Deutschland. With Sky/Premiere no agreement could be reached on the further distribution of our channel from July onwards was stated on the Hit24's website.

References

External links
 

Defunct television channels in Germany
Television channels and stations established in 2004
Television channels and stations disestablished in 2009
2004 establishments in Germany
2009 disestablishments in Germany